The following lists events that will happen in 2015 in Kyrgyzstan.

Incumbents
 President: Almazbek Atambayev
 Prime Minister: Djoomart Otorbaev (until May 1), Temir Sariyev (starting May 1)

Events

January
 January 1 - The Eurasian Economic Union will come into effect, creating a political and economic union between Russia, Belarus, Armenia, Kazakhstan and Kyrgyzstan.

May
 May 9 - A Victory Day Parade is held at Ala-Too Square for the first time in honor of the 70th jubilee anniversary of the end of the Great Patriotic War.

References

 
2010s in Kyrgyzstan
Years of the 21st century in Kyrgyzstan
Kyrgyzstan
Kyrgyzstan